Yellow Springs is a populated place in Blair County, Pennsylvania, United States, with the zip code 16693.

References

Blair County, Pennsylvania